Vicente de Gonzaga y Doria, (1602 – 23 November  1694) was Viceroy of Valencia, 1663, Viceroy of Catalonia, 1664–1667 and Viceroy of Sicily, 1678, second of the 11 sons/daughters of Ferrante II Gonzaga, 1st Duke of Guastalla, (1563 – 5 August 1630), married in 1587 to Donna Vittoria Doria dei Principi di Melfi, (1569–1618), daughter of Genoese Admiral of the Spanish Fleet and Member of the Spanish Royal Council, Giovanni Andrea Doria, Prince of Melfi.

Vicente's eldest brother was Cesare II Gonzaga, Duke of Guastalla.

Another sister, Zenobia de Gonzaga y Doria, (*1588 – +1618) married in 1607 don Giovanni Tagliavia d'Aragona, Duke of Terranova, a title awarded to Gonzalo Fernández de Córdoba in the year 1502, from a powerful Aragonese-Sicilian family, linked to the Princes of Castelvetrano, a Sicilian town, located at 37°41′0″N 12°47′35″E.

References
 
 Coniglio, Giuseppe (1967). I Gonzaga. Varese: Dall'Oglio.

1602 births
1694 deaths
Viceroys of Valencia
Viceroys of Catalonia
Viceroys of Sicily
Spanish untitled nobility
Nobility of Mantua
Knights of Calatrava
Vicente